The Presidential Range is a mountain range in the Green Mountains of the U.S. state of Vermont. All of the summits of the peaks in the range are located in Addison County but the eastern slopes in the northern part of the range extend into Washington County. The major peaks in the range are named for several U.S. presidents from the period of the American Civil War through World War I.

All of the peaks in the Presidential Range are above  and all but one are above . Both peaks are among the one hundred highest peaks in New England.

Description

From north to south (which corresponds to the chronological order of the corresponding presidencies), the Presidential Range includes:

 Mount Abraham, named after Abraham Lincoln, U.S. President, 1861–1865
 Mount Grant, named after Ulysses S. Grant, U.S. President, 1869–1877
 Mount Cleveland, named after Grover Cleveland, U.S. President, 1885–1889 and 1893–1897
 Mount Roosevelt, named after Theodore Roosevelt, U.S. President, 1901–1909
 Mount Wilson, named after Woodrow Wilson, U.S. President, 1913–1921

The three northernmost summits are in the town of Lincoln while the other two are in Ripton (all in Addison County). Except for Mount Abraham, the major peaks of the range are in the Breadloaf Wilderness in the Green Mountain National Forest. Mount Abraham is separated from the other peaks by Lincoln Gap, the highest vehicle-accessible mountain pass in Vermont.

Drainage basin

Most of Presidential Range lies within the watershed of Lake Champlain, which drains into the Richelieu River in Québec, the Saint Lawrence River, and then eventually into the Gulf of Saint Lawrence. Portions of Mount Roosevelt and Mount Wilson lie within the watershed of the Connecticut River, which drains into Long Island Sound in Connecticut.

Trails

The Long Trail, a  hiking trail running the length of Vermont, traverses the major peaks of the Presidential Range. The trail enters the southern edge of the Breadloaf Wilderness at Middlebury Gap on Vermont Route 125 and winds northward  along the ridge of the Green Mountains to Appalachian Gap on Vermont Route 17:

Apart from the Presidential Range, there are five peaks above  on this section of the Long Trail. North of Mount Abraham, there are four such peaks: Lincoln Peak, Nancy Hanks Peak, Mount Ellen, and Stark Mountain. South of Mount Wilson, the only such peak is Bread Loaf Mountain.

Thru hikers traverse  of trail between Mount Wilson and Mount Abraham. Along the way, four side trails provide access to the Long Trail (Emily Proctor Trail, Clark Brook Trail, Cooley Glen Trail, and Battell Trail) with limited off-road parking at each trailhead. There are three shelters on this section of the Long Trail: Emily Proctor Shelter, Cooley Glen Shelter, and Battell Shelter. Each shelter is at the intersection of the Long Trail and the corresponding side trail.

A popular day hike begins and ends where the Long Trail crosses Lincoln Gap Road in the town of Lincoln. Alternatively, the Battell Trail, whose trailhead is also in Lincoln, terminates at the Battell Shelter after .

The Emily Proctor Trail and the Cooley Glen Trail share the same trailhead. A popular loop hike begins and ends at this trailhead. The  loop hike takes in three peaks of the Presidential Range: Mount Wilson, Mount Roosevelt, and Mount Cleveland.

References

Mountain ranges of Vermont
Landforms of Addison County, Vermont